"Lucky Moon" is a song written by Doug Johnson and Mark Wright and recorded by American country music group The Oak Ridge Boys.  It was released in March 1991 as the first single from the album Unstoppable.  The song reached No. 6 on the Billboard Hot Country Singles & Tracks chart. It was the group's last Top 10 hit.

Critical reception
Edward Morris wrote in a column for Billboard that "Besides being a catchy, sing-along tune, it's also one that unleashes the Oaks' rich, buoyant vocal harmonies. The lads haven't sounded this fresh in ages."

Other versions
In 2011, the group rerecorded the song with a new arrangement and bass singer Richard Sterban on lead vocals for their It's Only Natural project at Cracker Barrel Old Country Store. The album included songs originally sung by Steve Sanders, who succeeded William Lee Golden on baritone vocals. The lineup on the new album included Golden.

Chart performance

Year-end charts

References

Songs about luck
1991 singles
The Oak Ridge Boys songs
Song recordings produced by Richard Landis
RCA Records singles
Songs written by Mark Wright (record producer)
Songs written by Doug Johnson (record producer)